The 2016 MIB Nordic Gorzow FIM Speedway Grand Prix of Poland was the seventh race of the 2016 Speedway Grand Prix season. It took place on 27 August at the Edward Jancarz Stadium in Gorzów Wielkopolski, Poland.

Riders 
The Speedway Grand Prix Commission nominated Krzysztof Kasprzak as the wild card, and Daniel Kaczmarek and Paweł Przedpełski both as Track Reserves.

Results 
The Grand Prix was won by Jason Doyle, who beat world champion Tai Woffinden, Chris Holder and Bartosz Zmarzlik in the final. As a result, Doyle closed the lead on Hancock in the world championship standings to seven points, with Woffinden now sitting one point further back in third.

Heat details

The intermediate classification

References

See also 
 motorcycle speedway

Poland
August 2016 sports events in Europe
Grand